The Patoka River National Wildlife Refuge and Management Area, established in 1994, is a collection of wildlife refuges and habitats situated along the Patoka River in Gibson and Pike counties in southwestern Indiana. As of 2010,  are owned by the U.S. Fish and Wildlife Service.

Many species of birds nest or spend the winter in these areas, including the bald eagle and endangered least tern.

In 2012, tier 1 of the Interstate 69 Project was built through this area immediately west of Oakland City in the strip long been set aside when the original Interstate was built, using a  bridge to lessen the environmental impact. Originally Interstate 69 was to go along a route similar to the current construction route. This has prompted some disturbances by the group Earth First!, including "evicting" the project offices in Oakland City.

See also
Patoka Lake

References & Resources

External links
 Official site

Important Bird Areas of the United States
National Wildlife Refuges in Indiana
Protected areas of Gibson County, Indiana
Protected areas of Pike County, Indiana